The Sapporo Nisai Stakes (Japanese 札幌2歳ステークス) is a Grade 3 horse race for two-year-old Thoroughbreds run in late August or early September over a distance of 1800 metres at Sapporo Racecourse.

The race was first run in 1966 and was promoted to Grade 3 status in 1984. Originally run over 1200 metres the race was increased to its current distance in 1997. It was run at Hakodate Racecourse in 1989. Past winners have included Jungle Pocket, Admire Moon and Logi Universe.

Winners since 2000

Earlier winners

 1984 - Western Five
 1985 - Kalista Kaiser
 1986 - Gal Dancer
 1987 - Miyono Speed
 1988 - Miyono Gold
 1989 - Inter Voyager
 1990 - Scarlet Bouquet
 1991 - Nishino Flower
 1992 - T M Hurricane
 1993 - Mellow Fruit
 1994 - Prime Stage
 1995 - Biwa Heidi
 1996 - Seiryu O
 1997 - I Am The Prince
 1998 - Meiner Platinum
 1999 - Meiner Condor

See also
 Horse racing in Japan
 List of Japanese flat horse races

References

Turf races in Japan